William Turnbull Swan (27 August 1827 – 15 March 1875) was a 19th-century politician in Auckland, New Zealand.

Swan was born in Serampore, West Bengal, India in 1827. At the time, the area was part of Danish India. His elder brother Thomas was also born in Serampore but all younger siblings were born in Birmingham, England. His father, Thomas Swan (1795–1857), was a minister for a dissenting congregation in Birmingham. His mother was Elizabeth Swan (1799–1871). In England, Swan had produced a popular book used in National schools. In about 1862, he moved from Birmingham to New Zealand after his publisher had gone bankrupt. In Auckland, he was a clerk at W. J. Young & Co in Queen Street. When the gold rush on Coromandel Peninsula started in 1867, he relocated to what became Thames and was one of the leading citizens who took control of the development of the town.

Swan then represented the Thames electorate in the Auckland Provincial Council from 17 October 1872 until his death. He died in his lodgings at Symonds Street, Auckland on 15 March 1875 aged 47 years. He held strong political views that were often unpopular. As a consequence, none of the fellow provincial councillors attended his funeral at Symonds Street Cemetery. Swan's grave was relocated in the 1960s to make room for the Auckland Southern Motorway.

Swan was succeeded on the Provincial Council by William Davies, the mayor of Thames, who beat former Newton councillor William Rowe in a by-election on 5 April 1875.

References

1827 births
1875 deaths
Members of the New Zealand House of Representatives
New Zealand MPs for North Island electorates
19th-century New Zealand politicians
Members of the Auckland Provincial Council
Burials at Symonds Street Cemetery